[Walter] Cresswell O'Reilly (6 June 1877 – 20 December 1954) was an Australian public servant who became Chief Commonwealth Film Censor. He "dominated and shaped Australian film censorship" and was able to "define appropriate mass entertainment" for nearly twenty years. He was the founding president of the National Trust of Australia (NSW) and an early urban conservationist.

Early life
Cresswell O'Reilly (he was always known by his second name) was born in New South Wales to Irish-American physician Dr Walter William Joseph O’Reilly and his Ballarat-born wife, Mary Narcissa O’Reilly (née Taylor).

He was educated at Newington College (1894–1896) and the University of Sydney from where he graduated with a Bachelor of Arts in 1903. He married Ethel Jane Vickery, a granddaughter of philanthropist Ebenezer Vickery, in 1909.

Army service
During World War I he served with the Australian Imperial Force in France as a gunner and then as a warrant officer, class 1, with the Army Education Service.

Public service
Before attending university, O'Reilly had been a junior clerk in the Department of Justice. After the war, he returned to the public service as an officer-in-charge in the justice branch of the Attorney-General's Department. In 1925 O'Reilly was nominated by the Methodist Church, the YMCA, and the Businessmen's Efficiency League as the senior Commonwealth film censor in Sydney. In this position he was de facto chief censor, as most films arrived in Australia through Sydney. Three years later he became chief Commonwealth censor and was reappointed annually until 1942 when he retired. As chief censor he introduced, in 1930, the classification system that graded films 'For General Exhibition' and 'Not Suitable for Children'.

Community service
O'Reilly was a Wesleyan and served as a trustee of Pymble Methodist Church for over 50 years, and was a choirmaster, Sunday-school-superintendent and lay preacher. He was elected to Ku-ring-gai Municipal Council as an alderman and as mayor from 1929 until 1933. As an early conservationist he earned a reputation as the 'tree mayor' and was president of the State branch of the Australian Forest League and a member of the Forestry Advisory Council. In 1945 he became the founding president of the New South Wales division of the National Trust of Australia. At Wesley College, University of Sydney he was a councillor and treasurer.

Honours
 Cresswell O’Reilly Lookout – 1030–1066 Pacific Highway, Pymble

Publications
 Wesley College (within the University of Sydney): a historical outline (Syd, 1956)
 Ku-ring-gai Shire: early history and development (Syd, 1948 & 1963)

Bibliography
 I Bertrand – Film Censorship in Australia (Brisb, 1978)
 G Shirley and B Adams – Australian Cinema (Syd, 1983)
 Film Censorship Board – Annual Reports 1925–42
 Sydney Morning Herald – 17 June 1942

See also
 Annie Forsyth Wyatt

External links
 Joel Greenberg, Walter Cresswell O'Reilly (1877–1954), Australian Dictionary of Biography, Volume 11, MUP, 1988, p. 96.

References

1877 births
1954 deaths
Australian Methodists
University of Sydney alumni
People educated at Newington College
Wesleyan Methodists
20th-century Methodists
Shire Presidents and Mayors of Ku-ring-gai